Some Remarks: Essays and Other Writing is a collection of short fiction and nonfiction by the speculative fiction author Neal Stephenson. It is primarily composed of Stephenson's previously published articles, essays, and interviews although it does contain a previously unpublished essay titled "Arsebestos" and an unfinished short story "Under-Constable Proudfoot."

Contents 
Source:
 "Introduction"
 "Arsebestos" - not previously published (2012)
In "Arsebestos", Stephenson draws connections between characters in Charles Dickens's A Christmas Carol who suffer from a lack of physical mobility and his own chiropractic issues in order to argue for the adoption of more physically active work spaces.
 "Slashdot Interview" - (2004)
 "Metaphysics in the Royal Society 1715-2010" - (2010)
 "It's All Geek to Me" - (2007)
 "Turn On, Tune In, Veg Out" - (2006)
 "Gresham College Lecture" - (2008)
 "Spew" - (1994)
 Selected excerpts from "In the Kingdom of Mao Bell" - (1994)
 "Under-Constable Proudfoot" - not previously published (2012)
 "Mother Earth Mother Board" - (1996)
 "The Salon Interview" - (2004)
 "Blind Secularism" - (1993)
 "Time Magazine Article about Anathem" - (2012)
 "Everything and More Foreword" - (2003)
 "The Great Simoleon Caper" - (1995)
 "Locked In" - (2011)
 "Innovation Starvation" - (2011)
 "Why I Am a Bad Correspondent" - (1998)

References 

Essay collections
Essays by Neal Stephenson